Sergio Alberto Contreras (born April 30, 1980) is a Mexican former minor league outfielder and first baseman. He is 5'11" tall and he weighs 180 pounds. He throws and bats left-handed. His twin brother, Albino, has also played professional baseball.

Career

Anaheim Angels
On June 5, 1999, he was signed by the Anaheim Angels as a nondrafted free agent. His first professional year started out a little bumpy-in 63 games with the Angels of the Dominican Summer League, he hit only .252 with 2 home runs and 33 RBI.

His next season-2000 with the Butte Copper Kings-was a complete opposite of his first. In 45 games, he showed great contact by hitting .399. He managed to hit 3 home runs and drive in 28 runs as well. At one point in his 2000 season, Contreras had scored a run in 13 consecutive games.

In 2001, Contreras played both American and Mexican baseball. With the Rancho Cucamonga Quakes, he hit .271 with 3 home runs and 37 RBI. His 15 stolen bases showed that he was developing more as a base-stealer than anything else.

In 2002, Contreras played with Rancho Cucamonga again, appearing in 81 games and hitting .271.

2003 was an off-year for Contreras. In 12 games with the Cedar Rapids Kernels, he hit only .176.

Tampa Bay Rays
After being picked by the Tampa Bay Devil Rays in the 2003 Rule V Draft.

Tigres de Quintana Roo
Contreras was then loaned to Mexico again and spent his entire 2004 season there. In 2005, he again spent his entire season in Mexico, hitting .314 with 9 home runs with 54 RBI. His 2006 season also was in the Mexican League, this time with the Tigres de la Angelopolis. He hit .370 in 2006. In 2007, he hit .300 with 29 steals for the Tigres de Quintana Roo. He hit .419 in the 2007 Baseball World Cup while playing for Mexico.

Contreras has never had a great eye at the plate, not once in his professional career has he walked more than 50 times in a season.

He was on the Mexico national baseball team in the 2007 Baseball World Cup, the 2008 Americas Baseball Cup and the 2009 Baseball World Cup. Contreras played for the Tigres de Quintana Roo in the Mexican League from 2005 to 2017.

Leones de Yucatán
Contreras signed with the Leones de Yucatán for the 2018 season, and began the 2019 season with the Leones. He retired at the conclusion of the 2019 season.

Sources

1980 births
Living people
Baseball players from Sonora
Butte Copper Kings players
Cedar Rapids Kernels players
Leones de Yucatán players
Mayos de Navojoa players
Mexican expatriate baseball players in the United States
Mexican League baseball first basemen
Mexican League baseball outfielders
Rancho Cucamonga Quakes players
Tigres de la Angelopolis players
Tigres de Quintana Roo players
Tigres del México players
Tomateros de Culiacán players
Mexican twins
Twin sportspeople
Yaquis de Obregón players
People from Ciudad Obregón